Nam Long Hospital was a hospital in Hong Kong specializing in cancer treatment that closed in 2003. The site is now a nursing home operated as Tung Wah Group of Hospitals Jockey Club Sunshine Complex for the Elderly.

The palliative medicine and acute geriatrics services were transferred to Grantham Hospital.

References

Defunct hospitals in Hong Kong
2003 disestablishments in Hong Kong
Hospitals disestablished in 2003
Hospital buildings completed in 1984
1967 establishments in Hong Kong